Thames Haven Railway Station is a freight terminal (formerly a passenger station) on the coast of Essex, England. It is the terminus of the goods-only Thames Haven branch.

History
The Thames Haven Railway Company was incorporated in 1836 to build a railway from Romford to Shell Haven, which was then a lobster fishing village. The powers for construction were renewed in 1846, though in 1853, the scheme to Romford was abandoned in favour of a single, four-mile branch, which was to run from a junction with Tilbury-Pitsea line to a new port to be called Thames Haven. After this, the branch was to be transferred to the London, Tilbury and Southend Railway for £48,000. It was intended to develop Thames Haven as a continental port for fish and cattle, as well as passengers, though this ambitious plan proved hard to realise owing to political instability in Europe in 1870, and then a ban on the importation of foreign cattle due to disease concerns. The passenger service from Fenchurch Street ended in 1880. By the 1890s, the branch saw just one train a day. Occasional passenger trains ran until 1909. A new service for workers from Tilbury and East Tilbury to Thames Haven began on 1 January 1923, which lasted until 9 June 1958, there were four intermediate halts at Mayes Crossing, Curry Marsh, London & Thames Haven Oil Wharves and Thames Haven.

Corringham Light Railway
The Corringham Light Railway, authorised in 1899, connected to the Thames Haven branch on its opening in 1901. It was initially intended to enter into an agreement with the LT&SR to run passenger trains onto the CLR, either by changing at a new platform or reversing at Thames Haven station. Even though the Thames Haven line had been re-signalled in 1889 to passenger standards, the passenger service was never re-instated after withdrawal in 1880- although one special did run over the branch in 1903, with the passengers changing at the old Thames Haven island platform. During the First World War, with the explosives factory at Kynochtown, some workers appealed for through-trains to Thames Haven from London, as problems had arisen with the motor transport which carried workers from Stanford-le-Hope to Corringham station. This request was never granted. Passenger service on the line was withdrawn in 1952 and parts of the line were absorbed into the Thames Haven complex in 1971.

Although no regular passenger trains ran after 1880, the station building was still standing in 1938.

Thames Haven branch freight operations 

The principal use of the Thames Haven Branch (Engineer's Line Reference THN) is for freight. The branch formerly served the Shell Haven refinery and the Coryton oil refinery transporting petroleum products from the refineries  in rail tank wagons. Liquefied ammonia was also transported from the Shell Haven site, and to the Fisons Ltd works at Stanford-le-Hope for the manufacture of nitric acid and ammonium nitrate fertiliser (since closed). The export of ammonia from Shell Haven ceased in 1980, Shell Haven refinery closed in 1999, and Coryton refinery closed in 2012.

The branch is connected to the national rail system at Thames Haven Junction between East Tilbury and Stanford-le-Hope stations  from a datum at London Fenchurch Street. From Port Junction the branch splits into 3 lines: 
 the most northerly line designated the Thames Haven Single runs to terminus junction at  where the line connects to the former Coryton and Corringham lines. From terminus junction the line branches north and east to the currently out of use Thames Oilport (formerly Coryton refinery), and directly to the east to the "not in regular use" Thames Haven Yard 
 the next line to the south is designated Port Arrivals 
 the most southerly line is Port Departures, both these lines connect to the currently six loading sidings of the London Gateway port. Railway operations at the port from the Network Rail boundary are controlled by the London Gateway Rail Control Centre located at the eastern end of the sidings.
The branch is not electrified and is only accessible by diesel locomotives, it has a route availability of 8, that is limited to an axle load of ≤22.8 tonne. There are currently (2017) nine freight paths to, and nine paths available from, London Gateway every weekday.

References

Bibliography 

Former London, Tilbury and Southend Railway stations
Railway stations in Great Britain opened in 1855
Railway stations in Great Britain closed in 1880
Disused railway stations in Essex